University of Tasmania Rugby Union Club is a Rugby Union club in Tasmania. Established in 1933, the club is a member of the Tasmanian Rugby Union, affiliated with the Australian Rugby Union and plays in the Tasmanian Statewide League. The club was a founding member of the Tasmanian Rugby Union,.
 
The club's home ground is at the University of Tasmania on Sandy Bay Road in Sandy Bay, Tasmania. Known as The Red Men, the club colours are red and white. The club currently fields a team in Men's First and Reserve Division competitions.

Premierships

Senior Team
Premiers First Grade 1934,1935 ....
Reserves Grade 2013

(Recess 1940–45)

References

External links
Australian Rugby Union
Tasmanian Rugby Union
University of Tasmania Rugby Union Club

Rugby union teams in Tasmania
rugby
1933 establishments in Australia
Rugby clubs established in 1933
Tasmania
Sandy Bay, Hobart
Women's rugby union teams in Australia